Theodor Döring (9 January 1803 – 17 August 1878) was a German actor.

Döring was born in Warsaw and settled with his family in 1807 in Prenzlau. He attended high school in Berlin. He found work as an actor, later working in Hamburg in 1834. He received a lifetime contract at the Berlin Hoftheater. He retired 15 June 1878 and died one month later in Berlin.

Honors
Döring received the Iffland-Ring in 1872. Döringstrasse in Friedrichshain in Berlin was named for him.

External links 
 Biography in the Allgemeinen Deutschen Biographie

1803 births
1878 deaths
Male actors from Warsaw
German male stage actors
Iffland-Ring
19th-century German male actors
19th-century comedians